Asclerobia is a genus of snout moths. It was erected by Rolf-Ulrich Roesler in 1969 and is known from China and Japan.

Species
 Asclerobia flavitinctella (Ragonot, 1893)
 Asclerobia gilvaria Yamanaka, 2006
 Asclerobia sinensis (Caradja & Meyrick, 1937)

References

Phycitini
Pyralidae genera